Next Door is a short 1975 film written and directed by Andrew Silver.  The 24-minute black-and-white film starred Matthew Bradley and Paul Guilfoyle. Kurt Vonnegut is also credited with writing the story.

Cast
 Matthew Bradley	
 Paul Guilfoyle		
 Gene Lasko		
 Lee Perkins as Kid
 Lisa Blake Richards	
 Bronia Wheeler

External links

1975 films
Works by Kurt Vonnegut